The plain-throated antwren (Isleria hauxwelli) is a species of bird in the family Thamnophilidae. It is found in all the countries of the Amazon Basin. Its natural habitat is subtropical or tropical moist lowland forests.  Unlike other Myrmotherula, it stays near ground level often clinging sideways to saplings.

The plain-throated antwren was described by the English zoologist Philip Sclater in 1857 and given the binomial name Formicivora hauxwelli. The current genus Isleria was introduced in 2012.

References

External links

 Pictures of the bird from arthurgrosset.com

plain-throated antwren
Birds of the Amazon Basin
plain-throated antwren
plain-throated antwren
Taxonomy articles created by Polbot